Dilek Serbest is a Turkish actress and model. She is best known for portraying the role of "İzadora" in the historical drama series Diriliş: Ertuğrul. She also portrayed the role of "Era" in the historical film Fetih 1453. She has also appeared in various movies and TV shows including Yarım Elma, G.O.R.A, Yarım Elma and Kaybolan Yıllar.

Biography 
Dilek Serbest started as a model and represented various brands such as Roman, Derishow, Arzu Kaprol and Loft. She also appeared in music videos for Teoman, Ege and Levent Yüksel.  Serbest made her film debut in the science fiction comedy G.O.R.A in 2003 and acted in the horror film Büyü and Tramvay. In 2012, she played Era in the epic film Fetih 1453.

Filmography
Yarım Elma (2002)
G.O.R.A (2003)
Büyü (2004)
Kaybolan Yıllar (2006)
Tramvay (2006)
Gurbet Yolcuları (2007)
Dedektif Biraderler (2008)
Şüphe (2010)
’’gümüş 
Fetih 1453 (2012)
Kara Para Aşk (2014)
Diriliş: Ertuğrul (2014) (season 1)
Erkenci Kuş (2019)

References

External links
 

1981 births
Living people
Actresses from İzmir
Turkish film actresses
Turkish television actresses
Turkish female models